Bruno Alexandre Parente Rodrigues, known as Bruno Parente (born 30 July 1981) is a retired Portuguese football player.

Club career
He made his professional debut in the Segunda Liga for Feirense on 25 January 2009 in a game against Santa Clara.

References

1981 births
Sportspeople from Coimbra
Living people
Portuguese footballers
C.D. Feirense players
Liga Portugal 2 players
C.D. Tondela players
Association football defenders